Uffe Manich Bech (born 13 January 1993) is a Danish professional footballer who plays as a winger.

Youth career
His career started in Hellerup IK, where he at the age of 13 switched to Lyngby Boldklub. Throughout his young career he got plenty of playing time in the various Danish youth national team, where he on several occasions has been the top scorer. Already at the age of 15, Bech signed a three-year contract with Lyngby. He was a big talent and went on trials at among others Blackburn Rovers and Heerenveen in 2009. Bech signed a new three-year contract with Lyngby in August 2010.

Club career

Lyngby
He got his official debut in the Danish Superliga on 1 August 2010 in a game against Silkeborg, where Bach played the last 5 minutes, coming on from the bench.

On 13 February 2011, it was published by Lyngby Boldklub that they would send him to Hamburger SV, where he would be allowed to train with the club until the following Friday. Lyngby's first-team coach Niels Frederiksen struck, however, that Uffe just went to Germany to try a big club. Bech got slowly more and more space in the squad. Especially after a game against Midtjylland in April 2011, where Bech replaced David Boysen with 20 minutes of the game left, and a few minutes later scored to the final result 1-0. Bech won the "U19 talent of the year in Denmark" in 2011, given by DBU.

Bech was officially promoted to the first team squad in the summer 2012. Already six months later, he extended his contract until 2014. The talented offensive player impressed everybody in his last season. After a fantastic half season in the 2012/13 season, with 17 league games and 5 goals, Bech got spotted by many clubs. Bech played in Lyngby BK until January 2013 when he was picked for the Superliga club Nordsjælland.

Nordsjælland
On 22 January 2013, he transferred to Nordsjælland on a three and a half years contract. After his arrival, he played 5 games in the first half season, before getting injured indefinitely. The injuries continued for the young player and he was operated in his meniscus in August 2013. However, he managed to get back in training only a month later and made his comeback in October. But a week after his comeback, he got injured again. It was once again in his knee. Bech had a bad start at his new club, as he played 11 games and scores two goals in the 2013/14 season.

But despite all these injuries, German club Mainz was ready to sign Bech in the summer 2014, however, their bid was too low for FCN and they rejected the club. Bech did very well in the 2013/14 season. He played 27 league matches and scored 10 goals. According to Danish medias, Midtjylland tried to sign Bech in February 2015. At the end of the season, Bech again bowed with knee problems. Bech revealed, that it was time for a change and he wanted to take a step up with some new challenges.

Hannover
On 8 July 2015, he signed a four-year contract with the German Bundesliga club Hannover. On 28 November 2015, he scored his first Bundesliga goal in his side's 4-0 home win against newly promoted side Ingolstadt.

Bech's first season in Hannover was marked by injuries and in April 2016 he torn a tendon in his knee, ruling him out for "a longer period of time". He ended up being out until December 2016. The 2016–17 season was a season riddled with injuries for Bech, and he did see not much playing time. He only played 7 games in this season.

On 31 January 2018, Bech moved to second tier Greuther Fürth on loan until the end of the 2017–18 season.

On 31 August, Bech joined Danish Superliga team Brøndby on a loan until 31 December 2018 with the option of a permanent transfer at the end of the first season half. After suffering an injury in the first minutes of a league match against Copenhagen and subsequently not playing for more than a month, Brøndby decided not to trigger the purchase option, and Bech returned to Hannover 96.

Panathinaikos
On 13 August 2019, he signed a three-year contract with the Greek Greek Super League club Panathinaikos.

International career
He has played for both the U-16, U-17, U-18, U-19, U-20 and U-21 Danish national team, where he during his time was top scorer for the first three. In 2011, he got the U-19 Danish national team talent prize.

Uffe Bech had his debut for the Danish national team on 11 October 2014 in a UEFA Euro 2016 qualification game against Albania.

References

External links
 Danish national team profile

1993 births
Living people
Footballers from Copenhagen
Association football forwards
Danish men's footballers
Denmark under-21 international footballers
Denmark youth international footballers
Denmark international footballers
Danish expatriate men's footballers
Danish Superliga players
Bundesliga players
Super League Greece players
Lyngby Boldklub players
FC Nordsjælland players
Hannover 96 players
SpVgg Greuther Fürth players
Brøndby IF players
Panathinaikos F.C. players
Expatriate footballers in Germany
2. Bundesliga players